Adlercreutzia is a genus in the phylum Actinomycetota (Bacteria).

Etymology

The generic name derives from H. Adlercreutz, a professor at the University of Helsinki in Finland, for his contributions to research on the effects of phytoestrogens on human health.

Species
The genus contains the following species:
 Adlercreutzia caecicola (Clavel et al. 2013) Nouioui et al. 2018
 Adlercreutzia caecimuris (Clavel et al. 2010) Nouioui et al. 2018
 Adlercreutzia equolifaciens Maruo et al. 2008
 Adlercreutzia hattorii Sakamoto et al. 2021
 Adlercreutzia mucosicola (Clavel et al. 2009) Nouioui et al. 2018
 Adlercreutzia muris (Lagkouvardos et al. 2016) Nouioui et al. 2018
 Adlercreutzia rubneri Stoll et al. 2021

Taxonomy 
In 2018, Nouioui et al. proposed merging the genera Asaccharobacter, Enterorhabdus and Parvibacter within the genus Aldercreutzia based on observed clustering of these genera within phylogenetic trees. However, subsequent phylogenetic analyses observed that Parvibacter caecicola exhibited much deeper branching compared to other Aldercreutzia species. Additionally, five conserved signature indels (CSIs) present in the proteins excinuclease ABC subunit UvrA, flavodoxin-dependent (E)-4-hydroxy-3-methylbut-2-enyl-diphosphate synthase, phosphoribosylformylglycinamidine synthase, valine-tRNA ligase and cysteine–tRNA ligase were identified to be exclusively shared by all Aldercreutzia species with the exception of P. caecicola. Thus, the emended description of the genus Aldercreutzia is the same as given before, with the exclusion of P. caecicola, which has been transferred back into the genus Parvibacter.

See also
 Bacterial taxonomy
 Microbiology

References 

Actinomycetota
Bacteria genera